is a Japanese voice actor from Chiba, Japan. He is part of Riki Project, a Japanese talent office run by Riki Takeuchi. He debuted in Ojarumaru, a Japanese manga series adapted for television, in 2004.

Yūto is best known for his role as Ginko in the anime television series Mushishi.

Filmography
 Aku no Hana, Nakamura's Father
 Bodacious Space Pirates, The Peace
 Bokura ga Ita, Teacher
 Casshern Sins, Akoes and Dune
 Detroit Metal City, Alexander Jagi/Masayuki Wada
 Guin Saga, Ricard
 Gunslinger Girl -Il Teatrino-, Bernard
 Katekyo Hitman Reborn!, Levi A Than (Levi)
 Legendz: Yomigaeru Ryuuou Densetsu, Wolfy
 Mushi-Shi, Ginko
 Natsume Yuujinchou, Yobiko
 Ojarumaru, Niwakawa Yukio
 Tokyo Tribe 2, Collens
 Yu-Gi-Oh! Arc-V, Gallager

Dubbing
The Mule, Gustavo (Clifton Collins Jr.)

References

External links
RIKI PROJECT
 
 Yuto Nakano at GamePlaza Haruka Voice Artist Database 

1967 births
Living people
Japanese male video game actors
Japanese male voice actors
Male voice actors from Chiba Prefecture